Yaw Konadu was a Ghanaian politician. He was a member for parliament for the Afigya-Kwabre constituency from 1965 to 1966.

Early life and education
Konadu was born on 25 August 1926 at Buaman-Ashanti in the Ashanti Region. He obtained his Standard 7 certificate in 1942 and continued at Commercial College from 1943 to 1945.

Career and politics
Konadu begun as an Office and Store Assistant at U. A. C. from 1946 to 1948. In 1949 he joined SCOA as a storekeeper until 1953. From 1954 to 1957, he was a private businessman based in Kumasi. He joined the Ashanti Regional branch of AUC once more in 1957 as a Supervisor of wholesale trading. He worked in this capacity until 1963.

Kunadu became chairman of the Kumasi North Local Council from 1961 to 1963.
He was elected member of parliament for the Afigya-Kwabre constituency from June 1965 until the Nkrumah government was overthrown in February 1966.

Personal life
His hobbies included; political discussions and football.

See also
 List of MPs elected in the 1965 Ghanaian parliamentary election

References

1926 births
Ghanaian MPs 1965–1966
Convention People's Party (Ghana) politicians
20th-century Ghanaian politicians
Possibly living people